The 2015–16 season was the 22nd season for the Ontario Junior Hockey League.

Team Change
The Hamilton Red Wings relocated to Markham, Ontario and were renamed the Markham Royals.

Standings 
Note: GP = Games played; W = Wins; L = Losses; OTL = Overtime losses; SL = Shootout losses; GF = Goals for; GA = Goals against; PTS = Points; x = clinched playoff berth; y = clinched division title; z = clinched conference title

North East Conference

South West Conference

Playoffs

External links 
 Official website of the Ontario Junior Hockey League
 Official website of the Canadian Junior Hockey League

Ontario Junior Hockey League seasons
OJHL